The LGBTQ community has a long recorded history in Ancient India due to the prevalence of tolerant religions and cultures in the region, with a turbulent period following European colonialism introducing homophobic and transphobic laws criminalizing homosexuality and transsexuality. In the 21st century following independence, there has been a significant amount of progress made on liberalizing LGBTQ laws and reversing the homophobia and transphobia of the previous colonial era.

Ancient period
Hinduism provides a wide breadth of literary and artistic sources showing LGBTQ life in Ancient India. Hinduism does not have explicit morals condemning homosexuality nor transsexuality, and has taken various positions on the topic, ranging from containing positive descriptions of homosexual characters, acts and themes in its texts to being neutral or antagonistic towards it. The concept of sexual minorities was widely known in the prevailing Hindu culture by the time Gautama Buddha founded his philosophies, and homosexuality was also thought to be viewed positively in Buddhism 
The Kama Sutra is an ancient text dealing with kama or desire (of all kinds), which in Hindu thought is one of the four normative and spiritual goals of life. The Kama Sutra is the earliest extant and most important work in the Kama Shastra tradition of Sanskrit literature. It was compiled by the philosopher Vatsyayana around the 4th century, from earlier texts, and describes homosexual practices in several places, as well as a range of sex/gender 'types'. The author acknowledges that these relations also involve love and a bond of trust.

The author describes techniques by which masculine and feminine types of the third sex (tritiya-prakriti), as well as women, perform fellatio. The Second Part, Ninth Chapter of Kama Sutra specifically describes two kinds of men that we would recognize today as masculine- and feminine-type homosexuals but which are mentioned in older, Victorian British translations as simply "eunuchs." The chapter describes their appearances – feminine types dressed up as women whereas masculine types maintained muscular physiques and grew small beards, mustaches, etc. – and their various professions as masseurs, barbers and prostitutes are all described. Such homosexual men were also known to marry, according to the Kama Sutra: "There are also third-sex citizens, sometimes greatly attached to one another and with complete faith in one another, who get married together." (KS 2.9.36). In the "Jayamangala" of Yashodhara, an important twelfth-century commentary on the Kama Sutra, it is also stated: "Citizens with this kind of homosexual inclination, who renounce women and can do without them willingly because they love one another, get married together, bound by a deep and trusting friendship."

After describing fellatio as performed between men of the third sex, the Sutra then mentions the practice as an act between men and women, wherein the homosexuals' acts are scorned, especially for Brahmanas. (KS 2.9.37)

The Kama Sutra also refers to svairini, who are "independent women who frequent their own kind or others" (2.8.26) — or, in another passage: "the liberated woman, or svairini, is one who refuses a husband and has relations in her own home or in other houses" (6.6.50). In a famous commentary on the Kama Sutra from the 12th century, Jayamangala, explains: "A woman known for her independence, with no sexual bars, and acting as she wishes, is called svairini. She makes love with her own kind. She strokes her partner at the point of union, which she kisses." (Jayamangala on Kama Sutra 2.8.13). The various practices of lesbians are described in detail within the Second Part, Eighth Chapter of the Kama Sutra.

The Arthashastra, a 2nd century BCE Indian treatise on statecraft, mentions a wide variety of sexual practices which, whether performed with a man or a woman, were sought to be punished with the lowest grade of fine. While homosexual intercourse was not sanctioned, it was treated as a very minor offence, and several kinds of heterosexual intercourse were punished more severely.

Sex between non-virgin women incurred a small fine, while homosexual intercourse between men could be made up for merely with a bath with one's clothes on, and a penance of "eating the five products of the cow and keeping a one-night fast" – the penance being a replacement of the traditional concept of homosexual intercourse resulting in a loss of caste.

A large number of erotic artwork dipicting homosexuality can be found on numerous temples throughout India, including Khajuraho temple sculptures built in the 700s, and the Sun temple in Konark built in 1200s.

Early modern period 

The Fatawa-e-Alamgiri of the Mughal Empire mandated a common set of punishments for homosexuality, which could include 50 lashes for a slave, 100 for a free infidel, or death by stoning for a Muslim. While pederasty was often considered as "pure love" and prevalent among those from Central Asia, in India, however, this wasn't as rife. For example, the governor of Burhanpur was murdered by a boy servant with whom he tried to be intimate with. Muslim Urdu poetry of the era sometimes expressed homoerotic viewpoints reminiscent of bromances, but these were not explictly homosexual in nature.
Homosexuality was prohibited for much of the existence of the Portuguese Empire. With the judicial records of prosecutions by both the Portuguese Crown, and Catholic Goa Inquisition, dating from the early 16th century. In 1528, a muslim man being noted as one of the first condemned to be burnt, made into dust, his goods confiscated for the Crown and his descendants defamed, for the crime.
The British Raj, in directly governed British territories, replaced the criminal offences and punishments set out in the Mughal Fatawa 'Alamgiri, with those of the 1862 Indian Penal Code, section Section 377 covering homosexuality.  The law stated: "Whoever voluntarily has carnal intercourse against the order of nature with any man, woman or animal, shall be punished with [imprisonment for life], or with imprisonment of either description for a term which may extend to ten years, and shall also be liable to fine. Explanation: Penetration is sufficient to constitute the carnal intercourse necessary to the offense described in the section." The law was drafted by Thomas Babington Macaulay, who based it on anti-sodomy laws that already existed in Britain." The term "order of the nature" was never defined, hence considering its vagueness, the law could apply to virtually any sexual act considered against this order by the British Judiciary, which included all penetrative sexual acts, except for vaginal penetration by a man.There are not many cases that were tried under this law, though, as there were only exist 5 recorded cases that were tried under Section 377 India till 1920. The law had a larger impact on social values than legal ones.

The anti-sodomy law in Britain and, in turn, India, was inspired by the 'purity campaign', an ideology that aimed at repressing sexual conduct in British society. This campaign also changed the perception and beliefs about sexualities in the European society.

One of the first sodomy-related cases to be prosecuted under British rule in India was the case of Khairati vs Queen Empress in 1884. Khairati was first called on by the police when he was seen dressed as a woman and singing with a group of women in Moradabad. The case was brought to the Allahabad high court, where Khairati was forced to undergo a medical examination and it was found that he had an 'extended anal orifice' which was the sign of a 'habitual catamite'. Cross-dressing was, again, used as evidence to support this argument.  Cross-dressing was normal in indigenous culture in India, but since this did not fit the moral standards of sexuality of Britishers and the ambiguity of Section 377, Khairati was arrested and prosecuted in court.

Khairati was later acquitted on appeal in the Allahabad high court.

Homosexuality was decriminalised in the French Indian territories of Pondicherry in 1791.

Republic of India (c. 1947 CE - present)

In 1977 Shakuntala Devi published the first study of homosexuality in India. Whilst convictions under Section 377 were rare, with no convictions at all for homosexual intercourse in the twenty years to 2009, Human Rights Watch have said that the law was used to harass HIV/AIDS prevention activists, as well as sex workers, men who have sex with men, and other LGBT groups. The group documents arrests in Lucknow of four men in 2006 and another four in 2001.

Homosexual intercourse was a criminal offence from the introduction of Section 377 of the Indian Penal Code in 1860 until the Delhi High Court's 2009 decision in Naz Foundation v. Govt. of NCT of Delhi. After the Delhi court's ruling was overturned in 2013, homosexual intercourse was re-criminalized until the Supreme Court of India's 2018 ruling in Navtej Singh Johar v. Union of India. This made it an offence for a person to voluntarily have "carnal intercourse against the order of nature."

AIDS Bhedbhav Virodhi Andolan Protest (1992) 
The AIDS Bhedbhav Virodhi Andolan (ABVA), or the AIDS Anti-discrimination movement, organized the first public protest against anti-sodomy laws in India in August 1992.

The ABVA was an activist group, with its original intent being spreading awareness regarding AIDS in India, as they opposed the intolerant practices and discrimination of the Indian government against HIV positive patients. They protested against the government policy that required the doctors to disclose the names of HIV-positive patients, who were then put in isolation. The group organized multiple protests demanding rights for HIV-affected people and sex workers.

In 1991, 7 members of ABVA published "Less Than Gay: A Citizens' Report on the Status of Homosexuality in India", which was the first report to publicly recognize the status of queer people in India and addressed the discrimination they faced. The report demanded the rights for the queer community in India, as it imposed a need to repeal Section 377 and the Army, Navy, and Air Force act of 1950. This report was followed by a public protest, organized by the ABVA in New Delhi, which is recognized as the first public demonstration against anti-sodomy laws in India. This demonstration protested Section 377 and its use by the police to harass the gay community. The protest was particularly sparked by an act of police brutality in Connaught Place, where 18 people were arrested on the charges that they were allegedly going to engage in homosexual acts. This protest was joined by over 500 people, which included multiple democratic and civil rights groups.

ABVA, in 1994, filled the first Public Interest Litigation (PIL) challenging Section 377 and its validity. This PIL was filed in a response to the denial by authorities to a request by ABVA demanding the distribution of condoms in Tihar Jail. The reason for this as stated by Kiran Bedi, the then Inspector General of Prisons in India, was the fact that the distribution of condoms would acknowledge and accept the existence of homosexual practices in the jail. The petition was dismissed in 2001 in the Delhi High Court.

The Friendship Walk (1999) 
The Friendship Walk is the first and oldest pride march in India and South Asia. This was first organized on 2 July 1999 in the city of Kolkata. During this time period, gay rights activists in India had started demanding that political leaders include gay rights as a part of their election campaigns, but these demands were ignored. So, in order to make a political statement, Owais Khan first proposed the idea of the friendship walk. This idea was circulated among the public and received mixed reactions until the walk was finally organized.

The pride march was joined by 15 people from all across the country, who wore custom-designed, bright yellow T-shirts with a graphic of footsteps and a motto that read 'Walk on the rainbow'. The participants of the march further divided themselves into two groups, one of which continued the walk towards North Kolkata and the other one towards South Kolkata. They proceeded to meet multiple Human rights organizations, NGOs, and AIDS prevention groups to voice their agenda and spread their message. The walk ended with both groups meeting at the George Bhavan where all the participants were interviewed by the media, as they shared their views on the issue of rejection of Homosexuality and sexual/gender non-conformity in India.  The news spread across South Asia and the pride march was met with strong support not only in India but from people in Pakistan and Bangladesh as well.

This walk became the inspiration for various pride marches that were organized all across the country in the subsequent years and influenced the sociopolitical scenario in many countries across South Asia

2009-2013

This law was struck down by the 2009 Delhi High Court decision Naz Foundation v. Govt. of NCT of Delhi, which found Section 377 and other legal prohibitions against same-sex conduct to be in direct violation of fundamental rights provided by the Indian Constitution.

Decisions of a High Court on the constitutionality of law (i.e. judicial review) apply throughout India, and not just to the territory of the state over which the High Court in question has jurisdiction. However, even after the pronouncement of verdict, there have been (rare) incidents of harassment of homosexual groups.

On 16 February 2012, the Supreme Court, during a hearing of a bunch of appeals filed against decriminalisation of gay sex, observed that homosexuality should be seen in the context of changing society as many things which were earlier unacceptable have become acceptable with the passage of time.

The two-judge bench, composed of Justices G S Singhvi and S J Mukhopadhaya, opined that homosexuality should be seen in the light of changing times where phenomena of live-in relationship, single parents and artificial fertilisation have become normal. They had also pointed out that many things, which were considered immoral 20 years ago, have become acceptable to society now. The bench said that homosexual sex was not an offence prior to 1860 and referred to paintings and sculptures of Khajuraho. Senior Advocate Amrendra Sharan, who opposed the Delhi High Court order of decriminalising gay sex on behalf of the Delhi Commission for Protection of Child Rights, had then submitted that social issues cannot be decided on the basis of sculptures. The apex court bench, however, observed that it is a reflection of society of that time and homosexuality should not be seen only in terms of sexual intercourse. Earlier, the Supreme Court bench had asked the anti-gay rights groups, challenging legalisation of homosexual sex to explain how such acts are against the order of nature as submitted by them. The apex court heard petitions filed by anti-gay rights activists and also by political, social and religious organisations which have opposed the Delhi High Court verdict decriminalising homosexual behaviour.

However, on 23 February 2012, the Union Home Ministry of the UPA government replying to a Supreme Court observation, told the Supreme Court that it was opposed to the decriminalisation of gay sex. "This is highly immoral and against the social order," the Home Ministry told the apex court. It said that India's moral and social values were different from other countries, and therefore, the nation should not be guided by them. The Central Government reversed its stance on 28 February 2012, asserting that there was no error in decriminalising gay sex. This resulted in the SC pulling up the Centre for frequently changing its stance on the issue. "Don't make a mockery of the system and don't waste the court's time", an apex court judge told the government.

Also in 2012, a guide titled 'Creating Inclusive Workplaces for LGBT Employees in India' was developed by IBM, Goldman Sachs, Google together with Community Business, a non-profit organization.

In December 2013, however, India's top court upheld the law that criminalises gay sex, in a ruling that reverses a landmark 2009 Delhi High Court order which had decriminalised homosexual acts. The court said it was up to parliament to legislate on the issue.

Indians have traditionally interpreted Section 377, a 153-year-old colonial-era law, as condemning a same-sex relationship as an "unnatural offence", and also considering it punishable by a 10-year jail term.  Political, social and religious groups petitioned the Supreme Court to have the law reinstated in the wake of the 2009 court ruling.

2013-present
The protests against the reinstitution of Section 377 took place across India, and resulted in political activism across political parties to declare their support for the law's repeal. By April 2014, the month of the upcoming election, at least three major political parties - the Aam Aadmi Party, the Congress and the Communist Party of India (Marxist) - had included support for decriminalization of homosexual relations in their election manifestos,.

In July 2014 first book on Genderqueer in Tamil and first Tamil book on LGBTQIA was from Srishti Madurai was released by BJP's state general secretary, Vanathi Srinivasan, at the 6th Hindu spiritual service foundation's sixth service fair, Chennai.

In June 2016, a dating platform called Amour Queer Dating was launched in India, for LGBTIQ people seeking long term companions.
In May 2017 the first Bhopal Pride March was conducted, gathering the participation of around 200 members.

On 6 September 2018 the Supreme Court of India invalidated part of Section 377 of the Indian Penal Code making homosexuality legal in India.
In striking down the colonial-era law that made gay sex punishable by up to 10 years in prison, one judge said the landmark decision would "pave the way for a better future."

Amidst 2020-2022, a lot of discussions have been happening regarding legal recognition of same-sex couples. A lot of cases have been filed by couples who want their marriages recognised under Special Marriage Act, 1954; Hindu Marriage Act, 1955; Foreign Marriage Act (1969).

Timeline

See also
 Timeline of South Asian and diasporic LGBT and queer history
 Kolkata Rainbow Pride Walk
 Recognition of same-sex unions in India

References